Lawrence C. Jones (August 10, 1893 – July 9, 1972) was a Vermont attorney and politician who served for 10 years as Vermont Attorney General.

Biography
Lawrence Clark Jones was born in Rutland, Vermont on August 10, 1893, the son of Joseph C. and Alice L. Jones. He graduated from Rutland High School and attended Worcester Polytechnic Institute from 1912 to 1915.

Jones studied law with his brother George and his father at the Rutland firm of Jones & Jones, and was admitted to the bar in 1918.  Jones practiced as a partner in Jones & Jones, and also became involved in politics as a Republican.  In 1924 he was elected state’s attorney of Rutland County; he was reelected twice, and served from 1925 to 1931.

In 1930, Jones was the successful Republican nominee for Vermont Attorney General.  He was reelected four times, and served from 1931 to 1941.   From 1939 to 1940 he was president of the National Association of Attorneys General.

In 1942, Jones was appointed chief attorney for the federal Office of Price Administration in Vermont.  In 1945, Jones was appointed Secretary of Civil and Military Affairs (chief assistant) to Governor Mortimer R. Proctor.

Jones died in Rutland on July 9, 1972.  He was buried at Evergreen Cemetery in Rutland.  Jones was survived by his brother George, wife Clara Hitchcock, one stepdaughter, and one stepson.

References

1893 births
1972 deaths
People from Rutland (city), Vermont
Vermont lawyers
Vermont Republicans
State's attorneys in Vermont
Vermont Attorneys General
Burials at Evergreen Cemetery (Rutland, Vermont)
20th-century American lawyers